Velebit is a village in Serbia. It is situated in the Kanjiža municipality, in the North Banat District, Vojvodina province. The village has a Serb ethnic majority with a population numbering 366 people (2002 census).

Name
In Serbian the settlement is known as Velebit (Велебит) and in Hungarian as Velebit or Fogadjisten. There is a mountain range in Croatia with same name (see: Velebit).

Ethnic groups (2002 census)

Serbs = 302 (82.51%)
Hungarians = 59 (16.12%)
Croats = 3 (0.82%)
Montenegrins = 1 (0.27%)
undeclared = 1 (0.27%)

Velebit is the only settlement with Serb majority in the Kanjiža municipality since all other settlements are predominantly Hungarian.

Historical population

1961: 604
1971: 562
1981: 449
1991: 361

History
The settlement was founded after the First World War, as part of the introduction program by which new immigrants were settled in Vojvodina.

Former mayor of Novi Sad Jovan Dejanović was born in Kanjiža.

References

Slobodan Ćurčić, Broj stanovnika Vojvodine, Novi Sad, 1996.

See also
List of places in Serbia
List of cities, towns and villages in Vojvodina

Places in Bačka